All Around the World is the third studio album by Jason Donovan, released in 1993.

The album was Donovan's first on Polydor Records and his first since parting with producers Stock Aitken Waterman. It featured the singles "Mission of Love" (written by ex-Halo James vocalist Christian James) (UK #26), "As Time Goes By" (UK #26) and "All Around the World" (UK #41). The style of the album marked a change of direction from his previous work. The singles had failed to sell as well as his previous hits and "As Time Goes By" would be Donovan's final UK Top 40 hit.

In a bid to generate more interest, Polydor Records licensed several of Donovan's old hits and included them on the album, much to Donovan's annoyance. Ten of the tracks were new recordings  and were initially intended to be the album, the additions were four of his hits with Stock Aitken Waterman and two songs from the Joseph and the Technicolor Dreamcoat cast recording, featuring Donovan.

The album itself proved to be a commercial failure, stalling at no.27 in the UK and not even being released at all in his native Australia. A fourth single, "Angel", was intended for release, but cancelled. Donovan was subsequently dropped by Polydor Records and this would be his last studio album for 15 years.

Track listing 

 "All Around the World" (4.17)
 "Falling" (3.23)
 "Mission of Love" (4.19)
 "As Time Goes By" (4.00)
 "Once in My Life" (4.32)
 "Rhythm of the Rain" (3.09)
 "Oxygen" (4.05)
 "Sealed With a Kiss" (2.32)
 "Angel" (3.42)
 "Any Dream Will Do" (3.54)
 "Give a Good Heart" (3.35)
 "Can't Do Without It" (3.56)
 "Close Every Door" (3.49)
 "Every Day (I Love You More)" (3.25)
 "Too Many Broken Hearts" (3.29)
 "Shout About" (4.01)

References 

1993 albums
Jason Donovan albums
Polydor Records albums
Albums produced by Stock Aitken Waterman